Athena Xenidou is a Cypriot producer, writer and director. She is the co-founder of XMAS Productions, a company aiming at producing entertainment for local and international distribution.  Xenidou is now in development of Socrates & Soc, a feature-length animated film.  She has co-written the screenplay with Barry Cook (director of Walt Disney's Mulan), and she is to co-direct the film once in production.

Education
After receiving a Diploma in Music from the Associated Board of the Royal Schools of Music, London, Xenidou went on to study English Literature, Music and Theatre for two years at the University of Fribourg in Switzerland. Xenidou then moved to Los Angeles and in 1996 she received her BA in Film Studies at the University of California, Santa Barbara.
During her studies at the University of California, she co-produced Dead End, her first short film, which received 'Best Project in Humanities and Arts at the University of California' award. She then wrote and directed her own short film, The Made Guy, which received Best Cinematography award at the UCSB Short Film Festival. After graduation, she produced another short film, Tripwire, with the American Film Institute in Los Angeles.

Work
She worked as Art Director in feature films starring Maurizzio Migheli and Bad City Blues, starring Dennis Hopper.
In 2001, she produced and directed her first feature film, Unwitnessed Memories  which won the Special Jury Remi Award at WorldFest-Houston International Film Festival, the oldest film festival in the USA. Unwitnessed Memories was an Official Selection and received Special Mentions at festivals around the world, such as the Int'l Human Rights Film Festival in Prague, the Int'l Festival of Visual Arts in Hungary, the Thessaloniki International Film Festival, Greece, Viewpoint Int'l Documentary Film Festival in Belgium and the International Documentary Film Festival Amsterdam. It won Best Documentary at the Film Festival in Cyprus and was also an International Emmy Awards semi-finalist.
In 2003, she accepted an offer from Fremantle SA, to direct reality TV series in Athens, Greece. She directed two seasons of Survivor and two seasons of The Farm, two of the most popular shows in Greek television history.

General
Xenidou was a member of the jury for the International Emmy Awards from 2001 to 2006.
In 2004 she was invited by the European Union as a film professional at the Cannes Film Festival.

Since 2007, Xenidou has been working mostly in theatre. Her collaboration with the Cyprus National Theatre –directing The Shadow Box – resulted in receiving Best Male Actor Award at the National Theatre Awards. She then went on to direct The Vagina Monologues. She is now to direct  Art.

Filmography

 DEAD END         – producer
(42 minutes, 16mm, color)
'Category:'  Drama

Year of Production: 1995

Production budget in Euro:  35,000

Co-producers:  University of California, USA

Prize:  University of California Grant for Best Project in Humanities and Fine Arts

THE MADE GUY        – producer/writer/director  
(12 minutes, 16mm, color)

Category:  Drama/Suspense

Year of Production: 1996

Production budget in Euro:  9,000

Co-producers:  University of California, USA

Prize:  Best Cinematography at UCSB Short Film Festival, USA

TRIPWIRE         -producer  
(27 minutes, 16mm, color)

Category:  Drama/War

Year of Production: 1997

Production budget in Euro:  42,000

Co-producers:  American Film Institute, USA

Distribution territories: IFC Independent Film Channel, USA

UNWITNESSED MEMORIES          – producer/writer/director  
(60 minutes, 35mm, color)

Category:  Documentary

Year of Production: 2000

Production budget in Euro:  110,000

Co-producers:  SIGMA TV and Radio, Cyprus, LUMIERE, Cyprus

Distribution territories: Cyprus, and Greece

Selection at Festivals: International Human Rights Film Festival,Czech Republic, International Festival of Visual Arts, Hungary, Int’l Film Festival in Thessaloniki, Greece, 
Viewpoint Int’l Documentary Film Festival, Belgium, Int’l Documentary Film Festival in Amsterdam, the Netherlands 
International Film Festival in Cyprus  
International Emmy Awards semi-finalist

References

Living people
University of Fribourg alumni
University of California, Santa Barbara alumni
Cypriot film directors
Cypriot women film directors
Cypriot film producers
Year of birth missing (living people)
Place of birth missing (living people)